Martin Gründling (born February 13, 1987 in Holíč) is a Slovak professional ice hockey player who currently plays for MHk 32 Liptovský Mikuláš in the Slovak Extraliga.

Gründling has previously played in the Slovak Extraliga for HK 36 Skalica and HC '05 Banská Bystrica, as well as the Czech Extraliga for HC Karlovy Vary and in the Kazakhstan Hockey Championship league for Arystan Temirtau.

References

External links

1987 births
Living people
Arystan Temirtau players
HC '05 Banská Bystrica players
HC Karlovy Vary players
HK 36 Skalica players
MHk 32 Liptovský Mikuláš players
Moose Jaw Warriors players
Slovak ice hockey defencemen
People from Skalica District
Sportspeople from the Trnava Region
Slovak expatriate ice hockey players in Canada
Slovak expatriate ice hockey players in the Czech Republic
Expatriate ice hockey players in Kazakhstan
Slovak expatriate sportspeople in Kazakhstan